The National Industrial Security Academy (commonly abbreviated as NISA) is an institution of Central Industrial Security Force (CISF) for training in industrial security and disaster management. The academy is situated in a  campus at Hakimpet, Medchal–Malkajgiri District, on the outskirts of Hyderabad, Telangana.

Established in 1990 in its present form, the academy imparts basic induction training to the directly recruited and promoted through departmental examinations assistant commandants and sub-inspectors, as well as provides professional and specialised courses for the personnel of CISF, other Central Armed Police Forces, state police, and public sector undertakings in India. NISA is headed by an Inspector General-rank officer, designated as the director; this post is currently held by Shri C V Anand, an Indian Police Service officer from Telangana-cadre. The academy has been recognised as the centre of excellence in industrial security management by the Government of India.

History 
Central Industrial Security Force was established by the Government of India in 1969 to provide security and protection to vital state-owned enterprises. The CISF Training College came into existence the same year at Partapur, Meerut District, Uttar Pradesh. Two years later, in 1971, the college was shifted to Shivrampalli, Ranga Reddy District of undivided Andhra Pradesh. In 1987 the college was transferred to its present campus in Hakimpet village of Ranga Reddy District, which now falls in the Medchal–Malkajgiri District of Telangana. The college was transformed into an academy on 8 December 1990.

Training 

The Training Sector of Central Industrial Security Force comprises NISA as the academy, the Fire Service Training Institute (FSTI) within the campus of NISA, and six Recruit Training Centres. The Sector is headed by an Inspector General-rank officer who also serves in the capacity of director of NISA. Shri C V Anand, an Indian Police Service officer from Telangana-cadre, currently holds the position since his deputation to the Centre. He assumed charge as director in August 2020

On 28 May 2016 at New Delhi, during the National Symposium on Excellence in Training (NSET),  NISA received a national award for 'excellence in training' in the category of trainer and faculty development. The Symposium is organised by the Department of Personnel and Training, and NISA was the sole awardee in 2016.

Securitypedia 
Securitypedia is an online encyclopedia of CISF developed and maintained by the research and development wing of the Technical Laboratory (TechLab) of NISA. Currently it is available only to CISF personnel through the employee web portal and mobile application EmpPower. However, the platform is envisioned to be made available to other Central Armed Police Forces in future. It contains articles related to security technologies including gadgets, CISF units, study material used by CISF trainees and articles on other various national and international law enforcement agencies. The encyclopedia is based on Wikipedia in a way that it allows its readers to edit articles after providing reliable and verifiable references but new articles can only be published after the scrutiny of the TechLab which is operated by a staff of CISF officers.

Campus 
A  suburban campus of the academy is situated in Hakimpet village of Medchal–Malkajgiri district, Telangana, on the periphery of Hyderabad city. It includes a hostel for officers trainees, three hostels for subordinate officers trainees, suites for flag officers, and barracks with capacity for 600 personnel. There is a language laboratory and training module based on the learning management system.

The Martyr's Memorial of CISF is located at the NISA campus. This memorial honours the personnel who have lost their lives serving for the nation since 1969.

Special Tactics and Training Wing 
Special Tactics and Training Wing (abbreviated as STTW) is a special training wing within NISA to train personnel for special armed combat skills. It was established in 2017 and provides training to the personnel of both CISF and other security agencies of the country. Based on American SWAT, the wing is raised to specially train personnel of most sensitive units where CISF is deployed including various airports, Delhi Metro and units in the red corridor of the country. The Quick Reaction Teams of different airports where CISF is responsible for security received priority in training.

Courses conducted 
 
The academy conducts different basic and promotion courses for gazetted and subordinate officers, basic courses for assistant commandants recruited through direct appointment and departmental entry, sub-inspectors executive and sub-inspectors fire through direct appointment, and promotion courses of all the gazetted ranks up to inspector general. Promotion courses of inspector executive to assistant commandant executive and inspectors, both ministerial and stenographer, to assistant commandant junior accounts officer, are also held at NISA. After the completion of training at NISA, assistant commandants and sub-inspectors are also awarded a postgraduate diploma in industrial security, law and management recognised by NALSAR University of Law.

Twenty-eight specialised outdoor and indoor courses and workshops are carried out by the academy; the Krav Maga and Parkour Trainer of Trainees Course for the subordinate officers and the other ranks are of the longest duration, spanning five weeks.

NISA conducts courses for other organisations as well; these include a three-week training course for Indian Revenue Service probationers, a disaster management course for district level officers, a critical incident management course for gazetted officers, a capsule course on installation security intrusion detection system and improvised explosive devices, and junior-level (for subordinate officers) and senior-level (for gazetted officers up to the rank of deputy commandant) industrial security courses. A five-day seminar on industrial security is also held at the academy.

Training to other organisations 
NISA also provides training to the personnel of different national and international security agencies and police organisations. 40 policemen, specialised in anti-fedayeen operations, of Special Operations Group of Jammu and Kashmir Police were trained at NISA in September 2018. The academy conducted an industrial security course for 30 Sri Lanka Police officers of ranks chief inspector, inspector and sub-inspector from 24 to 28 September 2018. The training programme was sponsored and entirely funded by the Government of India, costing over 5 million Sri Lankan rupees. A delegation of the Ministry of Interior, Government of Qatar, expressed its interest for the Qatar's industrial security force personnel deployed for providing security to the oil and gas installations of the country to be trained at NISA after meeting with the officials of CISF, including the Director General Rajesh Ranjan, on 19 November 2018 at its headquarters in New Delhi.

CISF Golden Jubilee Walkathon 
With a slogan of "let's walk together to make India secure", the wakathon was flagged-off at People's Plaza, Necklace Road, by Indian cricketer and the captain of the Indian women's national cricket team Mithali Raj in the presence of Telugu actor Sumanth, Dronacharya Award-winner athletic coach Nagapuri Ramesh, Telangana State Municipal Administration and Urban Development Department principal secretary Arvind Kumar and Hyderabad Commissioner of Police Anjani Kumar. Besides several CISF officers and personnel, participants were also included from other Central Armed Police Forces, Hyderabad City Police and civilians.

References

External links 
 Official website of CISF

Central Industrial Security Force
1990 establishments in Andhra Pradesh
Police academies in India
Ministry of Home Affairs (India)
Universities and colleges in Hyderabad, India
Central Industrial Security Force units